Zhenbeibu (Xiao'erjing: جٍ‌بِي‌بَوْ جٍ) is a town under the administration of Xixia District, Yinchuan, Ningxia, China. , it has one residential community and 5 villages under its administration.

References 

Township-level divisions of Ningxia
Yinchuan